Kallai FM is a 2018 Indian Malayalam-language drama film written and directed by Vineesh Millennium. Dialogues were written by Sreenivasan, who also starred alongside Sreenath Bhasi and Parvathy Ratheesh. The film is based on the real-life story of a radio repairer named Radio Koya (original name Hydros Koya) residing at Mankavu, Kozhikode, who was an ardent fan of singer Mohammed Rafi.

Plot 
Sreenivasan plays the role of Radio Koya, an ardent fan of late veteran playback singer, Mohammed Rafi.

Cast 
 Sreenivasan as Ceylon Bappu
 Sreenath Bhasi as Rafi Mohammed, Ceylon Bappu's Son
 Parvathy Ratheesh as Saira Banu, a flower seller and daughter of Ceylon Bappu
 Aneesh G Menon as Aju, Director
 Kalabhavan Shajohn as Abdullah Koya
 Kottayam Nazeer as Inaasu
 Krishna Prabha as Jameela, Ceylon Bappu's wife
 Sunil Sukhada as Purushu
 Vijilesh Karayad

Production 
The story of the film is based on the real life of K. Hydrose who is commonly known as Radio Koya, a radio repairer who lives in Kozhikode and a proud follower of Mohammed Rafi.

Release and marketing 
The film was released on 16 February 2018. Indian fast bowler, Irfan Pathan served as the promotional campaigner for the film in Kochi. The film music was released by the South Indian-based music record label, Muzik 247. The trailer of the movie was launched at CUSAT campus in Kochi on 6 February 2018. Veteran Hindi actor Jackie Shroff, Mohammed Rafi's son Shahid Rafi along with Irfan Pathan attended the launching event.

Soundtrack

References

External links 
 

Indian drama films
Films shot in Kozhikode
2010s Malayalam-language films